Ana Schmidt is a German architect and a painter, winner of the Threadneedle Prize in 2018. She focuses her work on urban landscapes.

Biography and career 
Born in Bochum, Germany, Schmidt moved with her family to Asia and lived in Vietnam and Thailand.

Years later, she moved to Spain to study at the Polytechnic University of Barcelona, where she received a Master of Science in Architecture. Schmidt also received a ARC Living Master from the Art Renewal Center.

In 2018 she won the Columbia Threadneedle Prize, a major art prize for contemporary figurative art.

She currently lives and works as an artist and urban planning architect in Bilbao, Spain.

Work

Selected solo exhibitions 

 Mall Galleries, London, 2019
 Cervantes Gallery, Oviedo, Spain, 2015
 L'Occhio Gallery of Art, Venice, Italy, 2013
 Torrene Aretoa Exhibition Space in Getxo, Spain, 2012
Basque Architectural Association in Bilbao, Spain, 2010

Selected catalogs 

 The Columbia Threadneedle Prize, Figurative Art Today. Mall Galleries, Federation of British Artists - January 2018. Pages: 2–4, 10
 13th International Art Renewal Center Salon, International Realism. Art Renewal Center - 2018. Pages: 183–189 and back cover - 
 Leonardo, Guía de arte y artistas. Galería Arte Libre - 2016. Page: 33 - 
 International Art Exhibition, NordArt, 06/06 - 04/10 2015. Kunstwerk Carlshütte - 2015. Pages: 148 - 
 International 2014/2015 Art Renewal Center Salon. Art Renewal Center - 2015. Pages: 14–18, 153, 159
 Acrylicworks 2, Radical Breakthroughs. North Light Books - 2015. Pages: 32–33 - 
 NordArt 2012, 02.06 -30.09.2012. Kunstwerk Carlshütte - 2012. Pages: 121 -

Media 

 Easel Words / Ana Schmidt, Nov/Dec. 2019 - Editor: The Jackdaw Magazine, London, UK
 Beauty amidst the ruins, Anise Stevens, Winter, 2016 - Editor: Acrylic Artist Magazine, US. Pages: 42–51

Awards 

 ARC Salon Award (landscape category), 2020
Columbia Threadneedle Prize for her painting, Dead End, 2018
ARC Salon Award (landscape category), 2018
ARC Salon Award (landscape category), 2015
 AixeGetxo Award 2013
 Ora Prize Award 2012 - 2013

References 

Year of birth missing (living people)
Living people
People from Bochum
Polytechnic University of Catalonia alumni
21st-century German women artists
Figurative art